Isabella Letitia Woulfe (11 May 1817 – 26 October 1870), writer known for an excellent debut novel.

Early life
Her father was Lord Thomas Graves, 2nd Baron Graves while her mother was Lady Mary Paget, daughter of the 1st Earl of Uxbridge. Isabella Letitia Graves was born on 11 May 1817. Her parents had twelve children including Woulfe. The peerage was Irish but Graves was also a member of Parliament in Britain and so although not entitled to sit in the House of Lords he was in the House of Commons. Scandal rocked the family when Graves committed suicide, supposedly because his wife was having an affair with the Duke of Cumberland although his wife had been living apart from her husband for some time. Woulfe was 12 when her father died. Lady Mary died when Graves was just 17.

Career
In 1844 Woulfe became a Roman Catholic. She married the only son of Stephen Woulfe, Stephen Roland Woulfe on 9 June 1853, an eminent Irish catholic. They had no children. During their marriage her husband was both magistrate and high sheriff for County Clare. He lived locally at Tiermaclane.

Shortly before her death, Woulfe completed a sensation novel, Guy Vernon, including gypsies, scandals and two cases of bigamy. The reviews for the novel were given in 1869. The reviews were generally positive, suggesting that for a first novel from the author it was an excellent start. She died in 1870 before she could write any further novels.

Works
 Guy Vernon. 3 vols. London: Hurst and Blackett, 1870.

References 

1817 births
1870 deaths
Irish women writers
19th-century women writers
Daughters of barons